Mangesh Ghogre is a crossword constructor who has had puzzles published in The New York Times, The Wall Street Journal and the Los Angeles Times. He is credited as being the first Indian to have constructed crosswords for the LA Times and the Wall Street Journal. His crosswords have also been featured in publications like Games and World of Puzzles.

Ghogre was recognized as the first India-based crossword constructor for the Los Angeles Times in 2010 and in 2012 became the first Indian to judge The New York Times crossword puzzle tournament. In 2014, the New York Times published one of Ghogre's crosswords for the US Independence Day edition on July 4 which was aimed at bringing the people of India and the US closer together.

In 2019, Mangesh Ghogre created a Mahatma Gandhi-themed crossword to celebrate his 150th birth anniversary, which the NYT published on October 2.

Career
His interest in crosswords began in the year 1997, when, in order to develop a good vocabulary for the GMAT, he started solving crosswords originally published in the Los Angeles Times.

After several rejections, his first crossword was published in the Los Angeles Times. As a tribute to the city of Mumbai, he published another crossword in the LA Times with the byline "Mangesh Mumbaikar Ghogre". Ghogre also continues to participate as a judge in the world's largest crossword tournament, the American Crossword Puzzle Tournament.

Ghogre is an investment banker by profession. A resident of Mumbai, Ghogre is an alumnus of Veermata Jijabai Technological Institute (VJTI), from which he graduated as a mechanical engineer, and NMIMS, where he secured an MBA degree with specialisation in finance. In June 2019, Ghogre was featured in Fortune magazine'a annual list of the 40 under-40 sharpest minds in business.

Ghogre also contributes to the "Speaking Tree" column of the Times of India.

In 2022, he was granted the prestigious Einstein Visa for his extraordinary skills in making American crosswords.

In December 2022, Mangesh Ghogre resigned from Nomura and moved to the US. According to The Economic Times, Nomura completed 27 IPOs while Ghogre was employed as the head of the bank's equity capital markets division, including a number of deals worth over $500 million.

References 

Crossword compilers
Living people
1980 births